Elisabete A. Silva is a British-Portuguese planning theorist. She is a professor of spatial planning in the department of land economy at the University of Cambridge. Silva was the first woman to be promoted to Senior Lecturer, Reader and Professor in the Department's history.

Career 
Silva joined the University of Cambridge in 2006 as a university lecturer (assistant professor). She earned tenure in 2009. In 2012, she became a senior lecturer (associate professor). In 2017, she became a  Reader and Professor in spatial planning and was promoted to full professor in October 2020. Silva is the first woman to be promoted to senior lecturer, reader, and professor in the department of land economy. She is the director of the University of Cambridge Lab of Interdisciplinary Spatial Analysis (LISA Lab).

She is a Fellow of the Academy of Social Sciences. She is also a member of the Royal Town Planning Institute (RTPI).

References 

Year of birth missing (living people)
Living people
Place of birth missing (living people)
Fellows of the Academy of Social Sciences
Academics of the University of Cambridge
British women academics
Portuguese social scientists
Portuguese women academics
British women social scientists
21st-century British women scientists
21st-century Portuguese women scientists
British people of Portuguese descent